Local elections to Northumberland County Council, a county council in the north east of England, were held on 12 April 1973, resulting in a council with no party forming a majority.

Results

References

External links
Northumberland County Council

1973
1973 English local elections
20th century in Northumberland